Farsta strand metro station is on the green line of the Stockholm metro, located in Farsta strand, Söderort. It is the end station for line 18. The station was opened on 29 August 1971 as the southern terminus of the extension from Farsta.

The Farsta strand commuter rail station is 200 metres away.

References

External links

Images of Farstra strand station

Green line (Stockholm metro) stations
Railway stations opened in 1971
1971 establishments in Sweden